Harry Sears may refer to:
 Harry E. Sears (admiral), U.S. Navy vice admiral
 Harry Edward Sears, American sports shooter
 Harry L. Sears, American lawyer and politician